EP300 antisense RNA 1 is a protein that in humans is encoded by the EP300-AS1 gene.

References